Harling is a civil parish in the English county of Norfolk.
For the purposes of local government, it falls within the district of Breckland.

The principal settlement in the parish is the village of East Harling, other settlements include Harling Road centred on Harling Road railway station, Middle Harling and West Harling.

Henry Nicholas Ridley, the botanist, geologist and naturalist who was instrumental in promoting rubber trees in the Malay Peninsula, was born in the village of West Harling.

Notes

External links

Breckland District
Civil parishes in Norfolk